Gino Guerrero Lara (born 24 October 1992) is a Peruvian footballer who plays as a winger for Universidad Técnica de Cajamarca  in the Peruvian Primera División .

Club career
In 2011, Gino Guerrero got his first chance to play for the Alianza Lima first team in the Torneo Intermedio cup, where he replaced Carlos Jairzinho Gonzales but could not help his side getting eliminated on penalties away to José Gálvez FBC.
The following season, he made his Torneo Descentralizado league debut in the 1–1 draw at home against Inti Gas for round 38. He featured for Alianza in 13 league matches that season.

References

External links

1992 births
Living people
Footballers from Lima
Association football wingers
Peruvian footballers
Club Alianza Lima footballers
F.C. Paços de Ferreira players
Juan Aurich footballers
Cienciano footballers
Club Guaraní players 
FBC Melgar footballers
Peruvian Primera División players
Primeira Liga players
Paraguayan Primera División players
Peruvian expatriate footballers
Expatriate footballers in Portugal
Expatriate footballers in Paraguay
Peruvian expatriate sportspeople in Portugal